The City of Blue Mountains is a local government area of New South Wales, Australia, governed by the Blue Mountains City Council. The city is located in the Blue Mountains, on the Great Dividing Range at the western edge of the Greater Sydney Region in New South Wales, Australia.

The Mayor of Blue Mountains City Council is Councillor Mark Greenhill, a member of the Labor Party.

Towns and villages in the local government area 

The urban part of the city consists of a ribbon of close or contiguous towns which lie on the Main Western railway line, served by NSW TrainLink's Blue Mountains Line, and Great Western Highway between Emu Plains and Lithgow. About 70% of the city's area is within the Blue Mountains National Park which lies north and south of the ribbon of towns. The National Park is part of the much larger Greater Blue Mountains Area World Heritage Site and the city brands itself as "The City Within a World Heritage National Park". The towns and villages are generally grouped into lower, mid, and upper mountains. The economy of the upper mountains is dependent almost entirely on tourism . The road to Sydney, the Great Western Highway, is mostly dual carriageway but is relatively slow due to the urban development and hilly terrain. The electric train service integrates into Sydney Trains, Sydney's suburban rail network.

The main towns and villages in the City of Blue Mountains are: 

 Bell
 Blackheath
 Blaxland
 Bullaburra
 Faulconbridge
 Glenbrook
 Hawkesbury Heights
 Hazelbrook
 Katoomba
 Lapstone
 Lawson
 Leura
 Linden
 Medlow Bath
 Mount Irvine
 Mount Riverview
 Mount Victoria
 Mount Wilson
 Penrith
 Springwood
 Sun Valley
 Valley Heights
 Warrimoo
 Wentworth Falls
 Winmalee
 Woodford
 Yellow Rock

Demographics

Council

Current composition and election method
Blue Mountains City Council is composed of twelve Councillors elected proportionally as four separate wards, each electing three Councillors. All Councillors are elected for a fixed four-year term of office. The Mayor is elected by the Councillors at the first meeting of the Council. The most recent general election was held on 4 December 2021.

Mayors

Council services

Cemeteries
The City of Blue Mountains Council maintains cemeteries at Blackheath, Faulconbridge, Katoomba, Lawson, Megalong Valley, Mount Irvine, Mount Victoria, Mount Wilson, Springwood, and Wentworth Falls.

Libraries
Blue Mountains Library operates three full-time branches, three part-time branches and a service for train commuters at Springwood and Katoomba stations two days a week.

Leisure centres 
Blue Mountains Leisure Centres operate from five locations. All five locations have pools and the Katoomba and Springwood locations have gyms and offer various fitness classes.

Heritage listings
The City of Blue Mountains has a number of heritage-listed sites, including the following sites listed on the New South Wales State Heritage Register:

 Blue Mountains National Park: Blue Mountains walking tracks
 Blackheath, Main Western railway: Blackheath railway station
 Faulconbridge, 14-20 Norman Lindsay Crescent: Norman Lindsay Gallery and Museum
 Glenbrook, Great Western Highway: Glenbrook railway residence
 Glenbrook, Great Western Highway: Glenbrook Tunnel
 Glenbrook, Mitchells Pass: Lennox Bridge, Glenbrook
 Katoomba, 10-14 Civic Place: Mount St Marys College and Convent
 Katoomba, Katoomba Street: Carrington Hotel
 Katoomba, 59-61 Katoomba Street: Katoomba Post Office
 Katoomba, 63-69 Katoomba Street: Paragon Cafe, Katoomba
 Katoomba, Main Western railway: Katoomba railway station
 Katoomba, 10-16 Panorama Drive: Lilianfels, Katoomba
 Lawson, Main Western railway: Lawson railway station
 Leura, 37 - 49 Everglades Avenue: Everglades, Leura
 Linden, 91 - 111 Glossop Road: Linden Observatory Complex
 Linden, off Railway Parade: Cox's Road and Early Deviations - Linden, Linden Precinct
 Medlow Bath, Beauchamp Road: Medlow Dam
 Medlow Bath, Great Western Highway: Medlow Bath railway station
 Mount Victoria, Main Western railway: Mount Victoria railway station
 Mount Victoria, Mount York Road (off): Cox's Road and Early Deviations - Mount York, Cox's Pass Precinct
 Mount Wilson, 68-78 The Avenue: Wynstay Estate
 Springwood, 345-347 Great Western Highway: Christ Church Anglican Church, Springwood
 Springwood, 39 Hawkesbury Road: Buckland Convalescent Home
 Springwood, Main Western railway: Springwood railway station
 Valley Heights, 110 and 112 Green Parade: Valley Heights railway gatehouse
 Valley Heights, Main Western railway: Valley Heights railway station
 Warragamba, Coxs River Arms: Coxs River track
 Wentworth Falls, 63-67 Falls Road: Davisville, Wentworth Falls
 Wentworth Falls, 1-15 Matcham Avenue: Weatherboard Inn archaelological site
 Woodford, 90-92 Great Western Highway: Woodford Academy
 Woodford, Old Bathurst Road: Cox's Road and Early Deviations - Woodford, Old Bathurst Road Precinct
 Woodford, The Appian Way (off): Cox's Road and Early Deviations - Woodford, Appian Way Precinct

Sister cities
The City of Blue Mountains has sister city relationships with the following cities:
  Sanda, Hyōgo, Japan
  Flagstaff, Arizona, US

See also 

List of local government areas in New South Wales

References

External links
 Blue Mountains City Council website
 Blue Mountains
 Blue Mountains Library

 
Cities in New South Wales
Cittaslow
Communities in the Blue Mountains (New South Wales)
Local government areas of New South Wales